Lee Carter may refer to:

Lee Carter (baseball), American baseball player
Lee Carter (comics), British fantasy artist
Lee Carter (EastEnders), fictional character
Lee J. Carter (born 1987), member of the Virginia House of Delegates
Viper (rapper) (Lee Arthur Carter, born 1971), American rapper, producer and entrepreneur

See also
Lee–Carter model, a numerical algorithm